Gnetum cleistostachyum is a liana species in the Sessiles subsection of the genus Gnetum described from South East Yunnan.

The name is still invalid and efloras states it is  advisable to postpone validating it until more complete collections, particularly with seeds, can be studied.

The stilbene derivatives, gnetucleistol A, B and C, gnetifolin A, p-hydroxycinnamic acid, piceatannol, resveratrol, bisisorhapontigenin A, gnetuhainin P, gnetulin, the stilbenolignans, gnetucleistol F, gnetofuran A, lehmbachol D, gnetifolin F and gnetumontanin, gnetucleistol D (2-methoxyoxyresveratrol), gnetucleistol E (3-methoxy-isorhapontigenin), rhapontigenin, isorhapontigenin, 4-methoxyresveratrol and pinosylvin can be found in G. cleistostachyum.

References

External links 

Gnetaceae
Plants described in 1975
Flora of Yunnan